Giancarlo Chanton (born 29 November 2002) is a Swiss professional ice hockey defenseman who is currently playing with Genève-Servette HC of the National League (NL).

Playing career
Chanton played his junior hockey with the Niagara IceDogs of the Ontario Hockey League (OHL).

On May 13, 2021, Chanton signed his first professional contract with Genève-Servette HC of the National League (NL), agreeing to a three-year deal through the 2023/24 season.

On June 8, 2021, it was announced that Chanton would be loaned to SC Langenthal of the Swiss League (SL) for the 2021/22 season.

International play
Chanton was named to Switzerland's junior team for the 2021 World Junior Championships in Edmonton, Canada.

References

External links

2002 births
Living people
Genève-Servette HC players
HC La Chaux-de-Fonds players
SC Langenthal players
Niagara IceDogs players
Swiss ice hockey players